Fairplay is an unincorporated community and census-designated place (CDP) in Washington County, Maryland, United States. Its population was 580 as of the 2010 census. It is sometimes recognized, along with neighboring Tilghmanton, as Fairplay-Tilghmanton; the two communities share a post office as well as a fire company. Fairplay is located between Hagerstown and Sharpsburg, along Maryland Route 65 and is part of the Hagerstown Metropolitan Area. Marsh Mills was listed on the National Register of Historic Places in 1996.

According to tradition, Fairplay was so named on account of the welcoming nature of the first settlers.

Refugee Resettlement Watch, an anti-Muslim hate group, has its headquarters in Fairplay.

Geography

Demographics

References

Unincorporated communities in Washington County, Maryland
Unincorporated communities in Maryland
Census-designated places in Washington County, Maryland
Census-designated places in Maryland